Bassillon-Vauzé is a commune of the Pyrénées-Atlantiques department in the Nouvelle-Aquitaine region of south-western France.

Geography
Bassillon-Vauzé is located some 25 km north-east of Pau and 8 km west of Maubourguet. The eastern border of the commune is also the departmental border with Hautes-Pyrénées. Access to the commune is by the D68 from Vidouze in the east which changes to the D148 at the departmental border and continues through the south of the commune west to join the D943 south-west of the commune. The D205 comes from Corbère-Abères in the north which passes through the commune and continues south to join the D148 in the south of the commune. The commune is mostly farmland with some forest in the west.

The Larcis river and the Lac de Bassillon, which is formed by a dam on the Larcis, form the eastern border of the commune. The Ruisseau du Boscq forms the western border of the commune as it flows north into the lake formed by the Retenue de Lembeye-Corbères dam.

Places and Hamlets

 Bassillon
 Camescasse
 Canton
 Les Garrus
 Grabette
 Lasplaces
 Marela
 Maury
 Millo
 Le Moutha
 Pachera
 Pouey
 Routgé
 Toubarthe
 Vauzé

Toponymy
Michel Grosclaude said that Bassillon comes from the Latin name Bassilius with the suffix -onem, giving "Domain of Bassius". The origin of Vauzé is undetermined.

The following table details the origins of the commune name and other names in the commune.

Sources:

Grosclaude: Toponymic Dictionary of communes, Béarn, 2006 
Raymond: Topographic Dictionary of the Department of Basses-Pyrenees, 1863, on the page numbers indicated in the table. 
Cassini: 1750 Cassini Map
Cassini1: 1790 Cassini Map

Origins:
Census: Census of Béarn
Reformation: Reformation of Béarn
Denombrement: Denombremont of Candau

History
Paul Raymond noted on page 23 of his 1863 dictionary that in 1385 Bassillon had 7 fires and depended on the bailiwick of Lembeye. On page 173 he mentioned that Vauzé had a lay abbey, vassal of the Viscount of Vauzé, and that the Barony of Vauzé was created in 1641 under the Viscounts of Béarn which included Peyrelongue-Abos and Vauzé.

The former communes of Bassillon and Vauzé were merged in 1833.

Administration

List of Successive Mayors

Inter-communality
The commune is part of four inter-communal structures:
 the Communauté de communes du Nord-Est Béarn
 the SIVU for roads in the canton of Lembeye
 the Energy association of Pyrénées-Atlantiques
 the inter-communal association for the supply of drinking water of Vic-Bilh Montanérès

Demography
In 2017 the commune had 66 inhabitants.

Economy
The commune is located in the appellation d'origine contrôlée (AOC) zone of Pacherenc-du-vic-bilh white wine.

Culture and heritage

Civil heritage
The commune has a number of buildings and sites that are registered as historical monuments:
The Maison Laïus Farmhouse (1765)
Houses and Farms (18th-19th century)
A Fountain (1833)
A Fortified Complex (Prehistoric)

Religious heritage
The commune has several religious buildings and sites that are registered as historical monuments:
A Presbytery (1853)
The Parish Church of Saint Girons at Bassillon (1783) The Church contains several items that are registered as historical objects:
2 Statues (19th century)
A Pulpit (18th century)
2 Stoups (18th century)
A Stoup (18th century)
Stained glass windows (19th century)
The Parish Church of Saint-Barthélémy at Vauzé (1773) The Church contains several items that are registered as historical objects:
A Stations of the Cross (19th century)
4 Altar Candlesticks (18th century)
A Stoup (18th century)

See also
Communes of the Pyrénées-Atlantiques department

References

Communes of Pyrénées-Atlantiques